Cristian Paul Arano Ruiz (born February 23, 1995, in Santa Cruz de la Sierra) is a Bolivian  football midfielder currently playing for Blooming in the Liga de Fútbol Profesional Boliviano.

Club career
Arano made his first division debut in a 3–0 home victory over Nacional Potosí on March 13, 2014. He scored his first goal with Blooming on August 9, 2015 in a 1-1 draw against The Strongest at Estadio Hernando Siles.

Club career statistics

International career
Arano was summoned to the Bolivian U-20 team to play in the 2015 South American Youth Football Championship.

He was named in Bolivia's senior squad for a 2018 FIFA World Cup qualifier against Venezuela in November 2015.

References

External links
 
 Soccer Punter profile Soccerpunter

1995 births
Living people
Sportspeople from Santa Cruz de la Sierra
Association football midfielders
Bolivian footballers
Club Blooming players
Club Petrolero players
Bolivian Primera División players
2019 Copa América players
Bolivia international footballers
Bolivia youth international footballers